The lamb and lion (often referencing Isaiah 11:6) could refer to

 General heraldry: The lamb and lion
 The Lion and the Lamb, a 1931 American comedy film
 The Lion, the Lamb, the Man, a 1914 American silent drama film 
 Lamb & Lion Records, an American Christian record label founded in 1972 
 Lions for Lambs, a 2007 American drama war film
 The Lion and the Lamb (Big Daddy Weave song)
 When Lambs Become Lions, a music album by Nothing Til Blood
 One Day as a Lion, rock power duo using ironic reference in their name of the 1930s Italian Fascist slogan, ""Better one day as a lion than a hundred days as a lamb."
 Helm Crag#The Lion and the Lamb, an English rock formation
 "Hosanna to God and the Lamb", a hymn which includes two variants of a verse reading in part, "How blessed the day when the lamb and the lion Shall lie down together in peace with a child."
 Coat of arms of the London Borough of Barnet

See also
Peaceable Kingdom
Child shall lead them (disambiguation)
The Wolf and the Lamb
The Lamb, the Woman, the Wolf